Tarsu va Sibarun (also Romanized as Tarsū va Sībarūn) is a village in Firuzjah Rural District, Bandpey-ye Sharqi District, Babol County, Mazandaran Province, Iran. At the 2006 census, its population was 314, in 78 families.

References 

Populated places in Babol County